Yerba Buena is the capital of the Yerba Buena Department in the province of Tucumán, Argentina. It is located at an altitude of around 466 metres (1528 feet).

The city of Yerba Buena is the most urbanized area of the department. It is mostly residential, although commercial activity has increased along its main road (Aconquija Avenue) with different kind of shops, shopping arcades, restaurants, bars and cafés. The main avenue has is lively, especially on weekends, when yerbabuenenses and people from its neighboring cities gather in search of fun and relaxation.

Yerba Buena is home to most of the country clubs and gated communities in the province, although there are slums scattered around the city.

Yerba Buena is a city, possibly given its name because people there may be friendly. There is a place called San Javier in the mountains nearby where there is a large cross called "El Cristo" (The Christ). Yerba Buena has experienced more growth than any other Argentine city since 1996 with an average of two residences per day being constructed.

Transportation
Because of being so close to San Miguel de Tucumán, Yerba Buena's only access is through Tucumán. Bus lines # 100, 102 and 118 embark every 5 minutes from San Miguel to Yerba Buena. Taxi services are also available. Yerba Buena has its own airport (Mauricio Gilli Aerodrome) for light and private aviation.

Sister city
Yerba Buena has one sister city:

 Asunción, Paraguay

See also

Yerba buena (Literally translated means "good herb")

References

External links
 Municipality of Yerba Buena The city's official website
 Yerba Buena Virtual Featuring local information, history, city map and cultural activities

Populated places in Tucumán Province
Cities in Argentina
Argentina
Tucumán Province